Cronius is a genus of crabs containing the two species Cronius ruber and Cronius tumidulus.

References

Portunoidea
Taxa named by William Stimpson